The Viaduc de Chillon is a viaduct in Switzerland located in Veytaux to the southeast of Montreux. Built by the Consortium des Viaducs de Chillon between 1966 and 1969, it takes its name from the Château de Chillon which lies downhill on the shores of Lac Léman.

The choice of a viaduct was dictated by the steeply-sloping terrain, the need to avoid extensive deforestation and the esthetic implications of the proximity of the Château de Chillon. A tunnel was considered for the site, but was rejected to keep costs down. The bridge uses prefabricated concrete parts, assembled from a crane spanning overhead from pier to pier

The two structures are staggered by several metres in height. At the northern end of the viaduct, the road enters the Glion Tunnel. The southern end of the viaduct ends on the heights of Villeneuve. The viaduct offers an expansive view of Lac Léman, the Chablais, and Haute-Savoie on the opposite side of the lake.

References

External links

 Viaduc de Chillon at the École Polytechnique Fédéral de Lausanne (in French)

Bridges completed in 1969
Concrete bridges
Road bridges in Switzerland
Viaducts in Switzerland
20th-century architecture in Switzerland